Statistics of Moldovan National Division for the 1996–97 season.

Overview
It was contested by 16 teams and Constructorul Chişinău won the championship.

League standings

Promoted: Sindicat Moldova-Gaz (Chișinău) and Roma (Bălți).

Results

Promotion play-off

 Codru relegated, Stimold-MIF promoted.

Goalscorers

References
Moldova - List of final tables (RSSSF)

Moldovan Super Liga seasons
1996–97 in Moldovan football
Moldova